Vitex heptaphylla is a species of plant in the family Lamiaceae. It is found in Cuba, Dominica, the Dominican Republic, and Haiti.

References

heptaphylla
Data deficient plants
Taxonomy articles created by Polbot